Marie Šťastná (6 April 1981, Valašské Meziříčí, Czechoslovakia, now Czech Republic) is a Czech poet. She has a degree in Art History and History of Culture from the University of Ostrava.

She participated in Ortenova Kutná Hora, a literary competition for poets under 22 years of age.
 1999-Third place
 2000-Honourable mention
 2001-Second to third place
 2002-Honourable mention
 2003-First place

In 2004 she received the Jiří Orten's Award (cs: Cenou Jifiího Ortena), a prestigious award for authors under thirty years, for her collection of poems, Krajina s Ofélií (Scenery with Ophelia). Juror Ivan Binar said "The unsightly book with a suspicious title was a great surprise and pleasure for me. I began reading, and didn't stop until I reached the end".

In 2010 she was awarded the Dresdner Lyrikpreis.

Šťastná regularly holds public readings  of her works in Ostrava and Brno, but also attends larger literature events such as "Literature May". She lives in Prague, Czech Republic.

Works
Years link to corresponding "[year] in poetry" articles:
 1999: Jarním pokrytcům ("To Spring Hypocrites")
 2003: Krajina s Ofélií ("Scenery with Ophelia")
 2006: Akty ("Nudes"),

References

1981 births
Living people
People from Valašské Meziříčí
Czech poets
Czech women writers
Czech women poets